Radl may refer to:

 Radl Pass in the Alps
 Emanuel Rádl, Czech biologist and philosopher